The following lists events that happened during 1935 in the Union of Soviet Socialist Republics.

Incumbents
 General Secretary of the Communist Party of the Soviet Union – Joseph Stalin
 Chairman of the Central Executive Committee of the Congress of Soviets – Mikhail Kalinin
 Chairman of the Council of People's Commissars of the Soviet Union – Vyacheslav Molotov

Events

January
 8 January – Battle of Khalkhyn Temple.

March
 27 March – The Franco-Soviet Treaty of Mutual Assistance is ratified by the USSR.

April
 24 April – William Christian Bullitt Jr., the United States Ambassador to the Soviet Union, hosts the elaborately prepared Spring Ball of the Full Moon, which is said to have surpassed all other embassy parties in Moscow's history.

May
 15 May – Joseph Stalin opens the Moscow Metro to the public.

June
 26 June – The balloon USSR-1 ascends to an altitude of 16,000 meters and is forced into descent by a release of hydrogen.

July
 24 July – First permanent children's railway is opened in Tbilisi.

August
 25 August – The Treaty of Establishment, Commerce and Navigation is signed between Iran and the USSR.

December
 28 December – Pravda publishes a letter from Pavel Postyshev, who revives the New Year tree tradition in the USSR.

Births
 7 January – Valeri Kubasov, cosmonaut (d. 2014)
 14 January – Yuri Zhuravlyov, mathematician
 1 February – Vladimir Aksyonov, cosmonaut
 24 March – Leonid Shebarshin, KGB officer (d. 2012)
 29 April – Andrey Zaliznyak, linguist (d. 2017)
 26 May
Gary Berkovich, architect
Allan Chumak, faith healer (d. 2017)
 4 July – Leonid Potapov, politician (d. 2020)
 8 July – Vitaly Sevastyanov, cosmonaut
 19 July – Vasily Livanov, film actor, screenwriter and animator
 26 July – Vladimir Nakoryakov, scientist (d. 2018)
 3 August – Georgy Shonin, cosmonaut
 2 September – Valentin Gaft, actor (d. 2020)
 10 November – Igor Dmitriyevich Novikov, astrophysicist
 23 November – Vladislav Volkov, cosmonaut
 5 December – Yury Vlasov, weightlifter (d. 2021)

Deaths
 28 January – Mikhail Ippolitov-Ivanov, composer (born 1859)

See also
 1935 in fine arts of the Soviet Union
 List of Soviet films of 1935

References

 
1930s in the Soviet Union
Years in the Soviet Union
Soviet Union
Soviet Union
Soviet Union